Batrachedra parvulipunctella is a species of moth of the family Batrachedridae. It is found in southern Europe and North Africa.

Adults are on wing from May to June and again from July to September in two generations per year.

The larvae live in white silky cases, feeding on the waxy secretions of Coccoidea species (including Aclerda berlesii) which occur on Phragmitis australis and Arundo donax.

References

External links
 Images representing Batrachedra parvulipunctella at Consortium for the Barcode of Life

Batrachedridae
Moths described in 1915
Moths of Europe
Moths of Africa
Insects of North Africa